Events from the year 1707 in Ireland.

Incumbent
Monarch: Anne

Events
April 14 (April 25 New Style) – at the Battle of Almansa (Spain) in the War of the Spanish Succession, the Bourbon army of Spain and France (with Irish mercenaries) under the French-born Englishman James FitzJames, 1st Duke of Berwick, soundly defeats the allied forces of Portugal, England, and the Dutch Republic led by the French-born Huguenot in English service Henri de Massue, Earl of Galway.
October 24 - an act of the Parliament of Ireland creates the Dublin Ballast Office to improve Dublin Port.
Tailors' Hall completed in Dublin.

Births
James Cuffe, landowner and politician (d. 1762)
Arabella Fitzmaurice, later Lady Arabella Denny, philanthropist (d. 1792)
Matthew Dubourg, musician (d. 1767)
Philip Skelton, Church of Ireland cleric and controversialist (d. 1787)
Approximate date – Sir Robert Deane, 5th Baronet, lawyer and politician (d. 1770)

Deaths

January 13 – Anthony Sharp, Quaker wool merchant (b. 1643)
April 29 – George Farquhar, dramatist (b. 1677 or 1678)
c. July 1 – William Handcock, politician (b. c.1631)
August 9 (bur.) – William Cairnes, politician and merchant (b. c.1669)
September 21 – Dominic Maguire, exiled Roman Catholic Archbishop of Armagh.
December 31 – Nathaniel Foy, Church of Ireland Bishop of Waterford and Lismore
Sir Francis Blundell, 3rd Baronet, politician (b. 1643)
Colonel The Honourable John Caulfeild, soldier and politician (b. 1661)
Ludowyk Smits, portrait painter (b. 1635 in Holland)

References

 
Years of the 18th century in Ireland
Ireland
1700s in Ireland